Azzam is a name of Arabic origin (and may refer to:

People

Given name
Azzam Sleit (born 1966), Jordanian engineer and politician

Surname
Abdul Rahman Hassan Azzam (also known as Azzam Pasha), Egyptian diplomat who is known for making the famous Azzam Pasha quotation
Abdullah Yusuf Azzam, Palestinian Sunni Islamic scholar and theologian
Ahmad Azzam, Syrian footballer
Azzam Azzam, person who was convicted of spying for Israel
Bob Azzam, Lebanese singer
Husam Azzam, Palestinian athlete and paralympian 
Mansour Fadlallah Azzam, Syrian politician

Nickname
Adam Yahiye Gadahn, spokesman for Al-Qaeda, also known as Azzam the American

Other
Azzam (2011 yacht), a yacht participating in the 2011–12 Volvo Ocean Race
Azzam (2013 yacht), Emirati luxury yacht in service since 2013
Azzam (2014 yacht), the winner of the 2014–15 Volvo Ocean Race
Azzam Publications, a British publishing house.

See also
Azam (disambiguation)